Garriskil is a townland in County Westmeath, Ireland.

Garriskil is one of 35 townlands of the civil parish of Street in the barony of Moygoish in the Province of Leinster. The southern boundary of the townland is formed by the River Inny.

The neighbouring townlands are: Barradrum to the north, Clonkeen and Monagead to the east, Ballyharney to the south, Cappagh to the south–west and Culvin to the north–west.

In the 1911 census of Ireland there were 4 houses and 22 inhabitants in the townland.

References

External links
Map of Garriskil at openstreetmap.org
Garriskil at the IreAtlas Townland Data Base
Garriskil at Townlands.ie
Garriskil at The Placenames Database of Ireland, Department of Arts, Heritage and the Gaeltacht

Townlands of County Westmeath